Possum Walk is an unincorporated community in northwest Nodaway County, in the U.S. state of Missouri.

The community is on the west side of the Nodaway River floodplain two miles southeast of the community of Elmo. Burlington Junction  is approximately 3.5 miles to the southeast and Clearmont is three miles to the east-northeast.

Possum Walk is an invented name. A variant name was "LaMar Station after the LaMar family that operated the Possum Walk Hotel that is now a national landmark.".

References

Unincorporated communities in Nodaway County, Missouri
Unincorporated communities in Missouri